Paldang Station is a station on the Gyeongui-Jungang Line, located in the city of Namyangju by the northern banks of the Han River. Although it is one of the older train stations in Korea (built prior to the 1945 liberation), the area around the station is not developed to a great degree.

Cultural Heritage

The old station is well preserved, and is one of the best surviving examples of the architectural style of the Japanese occupation era. The blue roof is typical of early train stations in Korea, and for this reason, it was designated as a national cultural asset. The old station building is currently juxtaposed with the newly renovated station (completed in 2007), and is a striking example of how Korean railroads have evolved so rapidly over a relatively short period of time.

Subway

Many residents near the station commute to Seoul daily, but the infrequent passenger train service previously rendered the area relatively isolated. To rectify this problem, residents petitioned local politicians and the Ministry of Construction. In response, Dosim & Paldang Stations were incorporated into the Jungang Line commuter rail system earlier than originally planned. The opening of this service has reduced commute times by over 30 minutes.

References

External links
 Station information from Korail

Seoul Metropolitan Subway stations
Railway stations opened in 1939
Metro stations in Namyangju
Cultural Heritage of early modern times of South Korea